Ger Reidy is a poet from Westport, County Mayo, Ireland. He has published three poetry collections, Pictures from a reservation, Drifting under the moon and Before Rain, as well as a collection of short stories called Jobs for a Wet Day.

References 

Irish poets
Living people
Year of birth missing (living people)